William Cocke (1748–1828) was an American pioneer, state legislator, and U.S. senator.

William Cocke may also refer to:

W. A. Cocke (1796–1844), mayor of Louisville, Kentucky
William Michael Cocke (1815–1896), member of the U.S. House of Representatives from Tennessee
William A. Cocke (1822–1887), Florida Attorney General, 1873–1876